Pauesia is a genus of parasitoid wasps in the subfamily Aphidiinae. The species in the genus use the conifer aphids (genus Cinara) as their host.

Pauesia anatolica is a parasitoid of the cedar aphid Cinara cedri, and Pauesia grossa is a parasitoid of the black stem aphid (Cinara confinis).

References 

 A revision of the genus Pausia Quilis in Japan, with descriptions of three new species (Hymenoptera : Aphidiidae). Watanabe, C. and H. Takada, Insecta Matsumurana, 1965, 28 (1), pages 1–17. Full article:

External links 

 BugGuide.net: Pictures of Aphoniinae

Braconidae genera